Boys Cry is a 2018 Italian drama film directed by Damiano and Fabio D'Innocenzo. It was screened in the Panorama section at the 68th Berlin International Film Festival.

Plot
Mirko and Manolo have been friends since primary school. They live in a suburb of Rome where they attend hotel school, hoping to finish as soon as possible and become bartenders.

One night in the car, they run over a man and flee without helping him. After the initial feelings of guilt, the two friends discover that this tragic event can be an opportunity for both of them. The man they have killed, as revealed by Danilo, Manolo's father, was a pentito of the Pantanos clan, a minor criminal family of the area, and Mirko and Manolo earn the right to enter the clan, obtaining respect and money that they never had.

Under the guidance of clan leader Angelo, the two friends start working for the clan as hitmen, killing some of Angelo's debtors, without reflecting too much on their actions.

Newfound power and money notwithstanding, Mirko struggles with his conscience. He separates from his girlfriend Ambra and argues with his mother Alessia. After a while, Angelo instructs Manolo and Mirko to kill an ex-boxer who took refuge near Rieti. Manolo seems to kill the boxer without problems, but later kills himself.

A shocked Mirko decides after long consideration to go to the police and confess, but before entering the police barracks is shot dead by a gun from a car speeding past.

Cast
 Matteo Olivetti as Mirko
 Andrea Carpenzano as Manolo
 Milena Mancini as Alessia, Mirko's mother
 Max Tortora as Danilo, Manolo's father
 Michela De Rossi as Ambra, Mirko's girlfriend
 Luca Zingaretti as Angelo

References

External links
 

2018 films
2018 drama films
Italian drama films
2010s Italian-language films
2010s Italian films